The 2009 China Baseball League season saw the Beijing Tigers defeat the Guangdong Leopards in 1 games to win the Championship Series.

Awards

References

External links
Official website Chinese

China Baseball League
2009 in baseball